This was the first edition of the tournament.

Tamarine Tanasugarn won in the final, defeating Iroda Tulyaganova 6–4, 6–4.

Seeds

Draw

Finals

Top half

Bottom half

References
 * Draws

2003 WTA Tour
Bangalore Open